Xenomedea rhodopyga, common name the redrump blenny, is a species of labrisomid blenny endemic to the Gulf of California. This species can reach a length of  TL.

References

External links
 

Labrisomidae
Fish of the Gulf of California
Fish described in 1971